The Ashram is a 2018 fantasy thriller film directed by Ben Rekhi and written by Rekhi and Binky Mendez. It stars Sam Keeley, Hera Hilmar, Kal Penn, Melissa Leo and Radhika Apte.

Cast
 Sam Keeley as Jamie
 Hera Hilmar as Sophie
 Kal Penn as Nitin
 Melissa Leo as Chandra
 Radhika Apte as Gayatri
 Suhas Joshi as Guruji

Locations 
The movie was shot at the Kedarnath Shrine and at several locations in the Himalayas.

References

External links
 

Films shot in India
2018 films
Indian fantasy thriller films
American fantasy thriller films
2010s English-language films
2010s American films